Black Wings of Destiny is the second studio album by the Black metal band Dragonlord.

Almost all of the previous album's thrash roots vanished, replaced with pure black metal. Peterson also began extending creative control to the rest of the band, instead of writing all the music himself for this album.  This is also the first album where the band first appeared in photos wearing corpsepaint.

Track listing
"The Becoming Of" – 1:18 (Eric Peterson, Derrick Ramirez)
"The Curse of Woe" – 5:39 (Peterson, Del James)
"Revelations" – 5:52 (Peterson, James, Ramirez, Lyle Livingston)
"Sins of Allegiance" – 6:48 (Peterson, James, Ramirez, Steve Smyth)
"Until the End" – 4:04 (Peterson, James, Livingston)
"Mark of Damnation" – 5:12 (Peterson, James, Livingston)
"Blood Voyeur" – 4:33 (Peterson, James, Livingston)
"Fallen" – 4:36 (Peterson, James, Smyth) 
"Black Funeral" – 2:37 (Mercyful Fate cover) (Michael Denner, King Diamond, Hank Sherman)
"Emerald" – 3:49 (Thin Lizzy cover) (Brian Downey, Brian Robertson, Scott Gorham, Phil Lynott)

Personnel
Eric Peterson - vocals, guitars
Steve Smyth - guitars
Derrick Ramirez - bass
Lyle Livingston - keyboards
Jon Allen - drums

Dragonlord (band) albums
2005 albums